LLD usually refers to Legum Doctor (LL.D.), a doctorate-level academic degree in law. LLD may also refer to:

 Loan Level Data, collected by the ABS Loan Level Initiative
 Low-level design of software components
 lld, the subproject of the LLVM compiler infrastructure project
 Ladin language, ISO 939-3 code lld
Leg length discrepancy